Rebecca Camilleri (born 6 July 1985) is a Maltese athlete specialising in the long jump and sprinting events. She represented her country at the World Indoor Championships, as well as two Commonwealth Games. In addition, she won multiple medals at the Games of the Small States of Europe.

Competition record

Personal bests
Outdoor
100 metres – 12.04 (0.0 m/s) (Marsa, Malta 2013)
Long jump – 6.41 (+0.5 m/s) (Marsa 2014)
Indoor
60 metres – 7.68 (Istanbul 2012)
Long jump – 6.08 (Padova 2015)

References

1985 births
Living people
Maltese long jumpers
Maltese female sprinters
Athletes (track and field) at the 2010 Commonwealth Games
Athletes (track and field) at the 2014 Commonwealth Games
Commonwealth Games competitors for Malta
Female long jumpers
European Games competitors for Malta
Athletes (track and field) at the 2015 European Games
20th-century Maltese women
21st-century Maltese women